V450 Aquilae is semi-regular pulsating star in the constellation Aquila. Located around 660 light-years distant, it shines with a luminosity approximately 2172 times that of the Sun and has a surface temperature of 3326 K.

References

Aquila (constellation)
Semiregular variable stars
184313
Aquilae, V450
M-type giants
Durchmusterung objects
096204